Radhey Shyam Vijayrania (1 May 1953 – 19 August 2006) was an Indian basketball player who represented India at the 1980 Summer Olympics and the 1982 Asian Games in Delhi. He was the second best scorer from the Indian team averaging 14 points after the leading scorer Ajmer Singh Chopra at the 1980 Olympics. He was a recipient of the Arjuna Award for his achievements. He died in 2006 at the age of 53 at his native village Sri Madhopur in Rajasthan.

References

External links
 
Arjuna awardees

1953 births
2006 deaths
Rajasthani people
Indian men's basketball players
Recipients of the Arjuna Award
Basketball players from Rajasthan
Basketball players at the 1980 Summer Olympics
Olympic basketball players of India
Basketball players at the 1982 Asian Games
Asian Games competitors for India
People from Sikar district